EDTA is ethylenediaminetetraacetic acid (and ethylenediaminetetraacetate), a chemical compound 

EDTA may also refer to:

 Electric Drive Transportation Association (EDTA)
 Epstein-Dumas Test of Adultness, an assessment of one's ability to perform in an "adult" capacity in various facets of life.
 European Dialysis and Transplant Association (EDTA)
 Educational Theatre Association (EdTA)